Barik Ab (also Romanized as Bārīk Āb and Bārīkāb) is a village in Qilab Rural District, Alvar-e Garmsiri District, Andimeshk County, Khuzestan Province, Iran. At the 2006 census, its population was 77, in 17 families.

References 

Populated places in Andimeshk County